Kelly Key – Ao Vivo is the first live album by Brazilian pop singer Kelly Key, released on January 20, 2004.

Track listing

Certifications

References

2004 live albums
Kelly Key albums
2004 video albums